Is Anybody Out There? may refer to:
 Is Anybody Out There? (song), a song by K'naan featuring Nelly Furtado
 Is Anybody Out There? (Fear the Walking Dead), an episode of the television series Fear the Walking Dead

See also
 Is There Anybody Out There (disambiguation)